Jamunamukh Assembly constituency is one of the 126 assembly constituencies of  Assam a north east state of India.  Jamunamukh is also part of Nowgong Lok Sabha constituency.

Members of Legislative Assembly
 1951: Bimala Kanta Bara, Indian National Congress
 1957: Maulavi Rahimuddin Ahmed, Indian National Congress
 1962: Begum Afia Ahmed, Indian National Congress
 1967: L.P. Goswami, Indian National Congress
 1972: Debendra Nath Bora, Indian National Congress
 1978: Mujamil Ali Choudhury, Janata Party
 1983: Mohammad Farman Ali, Indian National Congress
 1985: Abdul Jalil Ragibi, Independent
 1991: Abdul Jalil Ragibi, Indian National Congress
 1996: Khalilur Rahman Chowdhury, Asom Gana Parishad
 2001: Khalilur Rahman Chowdhury, Asom Gana Parishad
 2006: Badruddin Ajmal, All India United Democratic Front
 2006 (by elections): Sirajuddin Ajmal, All India United Democratic Front
 2011: Sirajuddin Ajmal, All India United Democratic Front
 2014 (by elections): Abdur Rahim Ajmal, All India United Democratic Front 
 2016: Abdur Rahim Ajmal, All India United Democratic Front
 2021: Sirajuddin Ajmal ;All India United Democratic Front

Election results

2016 result

https://en.m.wikipedia.org/wiki/Abdur_Rahim_Ajmal

2014 by-election

2011 results

See also
 Jamunamukh
 Hojai district
 List of constituencies of Assam Legislative Assembly

References

External links 
 

Assembly constituencies of Assam
Hojai district